WQHD-LP (91.1 FM, Super Q) is a radio station broadcasting a Spanish Tropical format. Licensed to Aguada-Aguadilla, Puerto Rico, the station serves the western Puerto Rico area. The station is currently owned by Aurio Matos Chaparro, through licensee West Coast Broadcasting.

External links

QHD-LP
Radio stations established in 2014
2014 establishments in Puerto Rico
Aguada, Puerto Rico
QHD-LP